Shinobius is a genus of spiders in the family Trechaleidae. It was first described in 1991 by Yaginuma. , it contains only one Japanese species, Shinobius orientalis.

References

Trechaleidae
Monotypic Araneomorphae genera
Spiders of Asia